Xanthoparmelia nana is a lichen species in the genus Xanthoparmelia found in Western Australia.

See also
List of lichens of Western Australia
List of Xanthoparmelia species

References

nana
Lichen species
Lichens of Australia
Lichens described in 1985
Taxa named by Syo Kurokawa